Julian Joseph Cardona (born December 4, 1990) is an American-born Puerto Rican international footballer who is currently without a club. He is the brother of Alexa Cardona.

External links
 
 Penn State University bio

1990 births
Living people
American soccer players
Puerto Rican footballers
Puerto Rico international footballers
Butler Bulldogs men's soccer players
Penn State Nittany Lions men's soccer players
Reading United A.C. players
Soccer players from Nebraska
USL League Two players
Sportspeople from Lincoln, Nebraska
Association football forwards